Samuel David Hauser (born December 8, 1997) is an American professional basketball player for the Boston Celtics of the National Basketball Association (NBA). He played college basketball for the Marquette University Golden Eagles and the Virginia Cavaliers.

High school career
Hauser played basketball, golf and football for Stevens Point Area Senior High School (SPASH) in Stevens Point, Wisconsin. His father, Dave, was an assistant basketball coach, and his younger brother, Joey, was one of his teammates for his final two years. In his junior season, Hauser averaged 18 points, 7.5 rebounds and 3.3 assists per game and led the state with a 50.6 three-point percentage. He led his team to a 27–1 record and the Wisconsin Interscholastic Athletic Association Division 1 state championship, scoring 25 points in the title game against Germantown High School. 

As a senior, Hauser helped SPASH achieve an undefeated season and win a second consecutive Division 1 state championship. He averaged 18.2 points, 6.7 rebounds, four assists and 3.1 blocks per game and was named Wisconsin Gatorade Player of the Year and shared Wisconsin Mr. Basketball honors with his teammate, Trevor Anderson. Hauser committed to playing college basketball for Marquette on May 17, 2015, over offers from Virginia, Iowa State and Creighton, among several other NCAA Division I programs.

College career
Hauser made his debut for Marquette on November 11, 2016, scoring 14 points in 19 minutes off the bench in a 95–71 win over Vanderbilt. He was named Big East Conference Freshman of the Week. On December 4, Hauser recorded a season-high 19 points in an 89–79 victory over Georgia. He scored 19 points in his subsequent game, two days later in an 84–81 win over Fresno State. On February 21, 2017, Hauser matched his season-high again, contributing 19 points with 5 three-pointers, 8 rebounds and 4 steals in a 93–71 victory over St. John's. He also helped his team set a program record for three-pointers in a single season. As a freshman, Hauser averaged 8.8 points, five rebounds and 1.3 assists per game, shooting 45.3 percent from three-point range while leading his team in minutes and defensive rebounding.

On November 27, 2017, Hauser scored a sophomore season-high 30 points, along with nine rebounds and four assists, in an 86–83 overtime win over Eastern Illinois. On December 21, he made a career-high 7 three-pointers in a 29-point effort to lead his team past American, 92–51. Hauser matched his career-high in scoring on January 12, 2018, with 30 points and 6 rebounds in a 94–83 loss to Butler. As a sophomore, he averaged 14.1 points, 5.7 rebounds and 2.9 assists per game.

For his junior season, Hauser was joined at Marquette by his brother, Joey. On December 8, 2018, he grabbed a career-high 14 rebounds, along with 13 points and four assists, in a 74–69 victory over Wisconsin. On January 15, 2019, Hauser scored a career-high 31 points to go with eight rebounds in a 74–71 win over Georgetown. In his following game, he recorded 25 points, seven rebounds and four assists in a 79–68 victory over Providence. Hauser was subsequently named Big East Player of the Week. After averaging 14.9 points, a team-high 7.2 rebounds and 2.4 assists per game, Hauser was named to the second team All-Big East. Following the season, he announced that he would transfer from Marquette to try to find a "better fit".

On May 28, 2019, Hauser committed to continue his career at Virginia and sat out the next season due to National Collegiate Athletic Association (NCAA) transfer rules. In his debut for Virginia on November 25, 2020, he scored 19 points in an 89–54 win against Towson. As a senior, he averaged 16 points, 6.8 rebounds and 1.8 assists per game. On March 25, 2021, Hauser announced that he would declare for the 2021 NBA draft, ending his short tenure as a Cavalier.

Professional career

Boston Celtics (2021–present)
After going undrafted in the 2021 NBA draft, Hauser signed a two-way contract with the Boston Celtics on August 13, 2021, splitting time with their G League affiliate, the Maine Celtics. On November 20, 2021, Hauser made his NBA debut in a 111–105 win over the Oklahoma City Thunder. On February 11, 2022, Hauser's two-way contract was converted into a standard NBA contract. The Celtics reached the 2022 NBA Finals, but were defeated by the Golden State Warriors in 6 games.

On July 3, 2022, Hauser re-signed with the Celtics on a three-year, $6M deal. 

On November 9, 2022, Hauser recorded a career high 24 points in a 128–112 win over the Detroit Pistons.

On February 14, 2023, Hauser hit a 3-pointer with 3 seconds on the game clock to tie a game against the Bucks, eventually sending it to overtime.

Career statistics

NBA

Regular season

|-
| style="text-align:left;"| 
| style="text-align:left;"| Boston
| 26 || 0 || 6.1 || .460 || .432 || — || 1.1 || .4 || .0 || .1 || 2.5
|- class="sortbottom"
| style="text-align:center;" colspan="2"| Career
| 26 || 0 || 6.1 || .460 || .432 || — || 1.1 || .4 || .0 || .1 || 2.5

Playoffs

|-
| style="text-align:left;"| 2022
| style="text-align:left;"| Boston
| 7 || 0 || 2.1 || .250 || .333 || 1.000 || .1 || .3 || .0 || .0 || .7
|- class="sortbottom"
| style="text-align:center;" colspan="2"| Career
| 7 || 0 || 2.1 || .250 || .333 || 1.000 || .1 || .3 || .0 || .0 || .7

College

|-
| style="text-align:left;"| 2016–17
| style="text-align:left;"| Marquette
| 32 || 28 || 26.5 || .473 || .453 || .828 || 5.0 || 1.3 || .8 || .6 || 8.8
|-
| style="text-align:left;"| 2017–18
| style="text-align:left;"| Marquette
| 35 || 35 || 32.6 || .499 || .487 || .836 || 5.7 || 2.9 || 1.0 || .5 || 14.1
|-
| style="text-align:left;"| 2018–19
| style="text-align:left;"| Marquette
| 34 || 33 || 33.4 || .459 || .402 || .924 || 7.2 || 2.4 || .6 || .5 || 14.9
|-
| style="text-align:left;"| 2019–20
| style="text-align:left;"| Virginia
| style="text-align:center;" colspan="11"|  Redshirt
|-
| style="text-align:left;"| 2020–21
| style="text-align:left;"| Virginia
| 25 || 25 || 34.2 || .503 || .417 || .896 || 6.8 || 1.8 || .6 || .4 || 16.0
|- class="sortbottom"
| style="text-align:center;" colspan="2"| Career
| 126 || 121 || 31.6 || .483 || .439 || .880 || 6.1 || 2.1 || .8 || .5 || 13.3

Personal life
Hauser's younger brother, Joey, was his basketball teammate in high school and collegiately at Marquette. His sister, Nicole Hauser, played volleyball at Southern Connecticut.

References

https://www.linkedin.com/in/jackson-hauser-9a0b87223/

External links
Virginia Cavaliers bio
Marquette Golden Eagles bio

1997 births
Living people
American men's basketball players
Basketball players from Wisconsin
Boston Celtics players
Maine Celtics players
Marquette Golden Eagles men's basketball players
Small forwards
Sportspeople from Green Bay, Wisconsin
Undrafted National Basketball Association players
Virginia Cavaliers men's basketball players